House Creek Township (also designated Township 7) is one of twenty townships within Wake County, North Carolina, United States. As of the 2010 census, House Creek Township had a population of 57,439, an 11.0% increase over 2000.

House Creek Township, occupying  in north-central Wake County, is almost completely occupied by portions of the city of Raleigh.

References

Townships in Wake County, North Carolina
Townships in North Carolina